The Kerma culture or Kerma kingdom was an early civilization centered in Kerma, Sudan. It flourished from around 2500 BC to 1500 BC in ancient Nubia. The Kerma culture was based in the southern part of Nubia, or "Upper Nubia" (in parts of present-day northern and central Sudan), and later extended its reach northward into Lower Nubia and the border of Egypt. The polity seems to have been one of a number of Nile Valley states during the Middle Kingdom of Egypt. In the Kingdom of Kerma's latest phase, lasting from about 1700 to 1500 BC, it absorbed the Sudanese kingdom of Sai and became a sizable, populous empire rivaling Egypt. Around 1500 BC, it was absorbed into the New Kingdom of Egypt, but rebellions continued for centuries. By the eleventh century BC, the more-Egyptianized Kingdom of Kush emerged, possibly from Kerma, and regained the region's independence from Egypt.

Site

The primary site of Kerma that forms the heart of the Kingdom of Kerma includes both an extensive town and a cemetery consisting of large tumuli. The level of affluence at the site demonstrated the power of the Kingdom of Kerma, especially during the Second Intermediate Period when the Kermans threatened the southern borders of Egypt.

Ecopolitical structure
Until recently, the Kerma civilisation was known only from the townsite and cemeteries of its metropolitan centre and smaller sites in Kerma, Sudan. However, recent survey and excavation work has identified many new sites south of Kerma, many located on channels of the Nile, now dry, which lay to the east of the modern course of the river. This pattern of settlement indicates a substantial population and for the first time provides us with some sort of context in which we can place Kerma itself. Survey work in advance of the Merowe Dam at the Fourth Cataract has confirmed the presence of Kerma sites at least as far upriver as the Abu Hamad/Mograt Island area.

Kerma was evidently a sizable political entity - Egyptian records speak of its rich and populous agricultural regions. Unlike Egypt, Kerma seems to have been highly centralized. It controlled the 1st to 4th Cataracts, which meant its domain was as extensive as ancient Egypt.

Numerous village communities scattered alongside fields of crops made up the bulk of the realm, but there also seems to have been districts where pastoralism (goat, sheep and cattle) and gold processing were important industries. Certain Kerma towns served to centralize agricultural products and direct trade. Analysis of the skulls of thousands of cattle interred in royal Kerma tombs suggest that stock were sometimes brought vast distances, from far districts, presumably as a type of tribute from rural communities on the death of Kerma's monarchs. This parallels the importance of cattle as royal property in other parts of Africa at later times.

Only the centres of Kerma and Sai Island seem to have had contained sizable urban populations. Possibly further excavations will reveal other regional centres. At Kerma and Sai, there is much evidence of wealthy elites, and a class of dignitaries who monitored trade in merchandise arriving from far-off lands, and who supervised shipments dispatched from administrative buildings. Evidently, Kerma played an important intermediary role in the trade of luxury items from the Central African interior to Egypt.

History

Egyptian Old Kingdom epigraphic evidence, as well as evidence from Aniba (Nubia), indicate contacts with early Nubia at that time (2700–2200 BC), as well as the presence of early Nubian regional rulers. It appears that they were initially loyal to the kings of Egypt.

The last mention in Sudan of an Old Kingdom of Egypt Pharaoh, Neuserre of the Fifth Dynasty was in 2400 BC Buhen, and the desert west of Toshka; no Egyptian presence occurs by the subsequent Sixth Dynasty.

Regional contacts 
The Gash Group, a neolithic culture that flourished from 3000 to 1800 BC in Eritrea and the Eastern Sudan, had contacts with Kerma during the whole period of its development. Kerma elements occurred along the whole stratigraphic sequence at Mahal Teglinos, the main site of the Gash Group.

For many centuries, the Gash people were included in the circuit of interchange between Egypt and the southern regions of the Nile valley, so Mahal Teglinos became an important commercial partner of the Kerma state. This trade activity clearly contributed to the rise of complex societies in the region.

By 2300 BC, the Early C-Group culture was also appearing in Lower Nubia, most likely arriving from Dongola Reach (near Kerma).  Thus, by the second millennium BC, Kerma was the centre of a large kingdom, probably the first in the Eastern Sudan, that rivelled Egypt.

Egyptian Middle Kingdom period 
The Middle Kerma Period, coinciding with the Middle Kingdom of Egypt, continued from the reigns of Amenemhat I to Sobekhotep IV (c. 1990-1725 BC). This is when Egypt began the conquest of Lower Nubia. The Twelfth Dynasty of Egypt Pharaoh Senwosret I established forts at Ikkur, Quban, Aniba, Buhen, and Kor.  The fort at Qubban protected gold mining operations along Wadi Allaqi and Wadi Gabgaba.

The long history of Egyptian military activity in Lower Nubia may indicate that Kerma was perceived as a threat to Pharaonic Egypt at varying times. Principal Egyptian fortifications were built in the middle Nile Valley during the Middle Kingdom. These were to secure the Upper Egyptian border against raids from Kerma, and more than likely and to protect the valuable trade routes between the two regions. Both during the Middle and New Kingdoms, the resources Kerma possessed – gold, cattle, milk products, ebony, incense, ivory, etc. – were much coveted by Egypt. Its army were built around archers.

Yet, Egyptian control weakened during the 13th Dynasty and 2nd Intermediate Period.  This became the period of greatest development of Kerma and its greatest extent.  Massive royal tombs were built in the city's necropolis, and included a large number of human sacrifices, and secondary burials.  Two large tumuli include white quartzite cones.  Kushite confrontations also occurred with Egypt in Lower Nubia.

During its zenith, Kerma formed a partnership with the Hyksos and tried to crush Egypt. Discoveries in 2003 at the Governor of El Kab's Tomb (near Thebes) show that Kerma invaded deep into Egypt between 1575 and 1550 BC. It is believed that this was one of Egypt's most humiliating defeats, which later pharaohs had erased from the official historic records. Many royal statues and monuments were looted from Egypt and removed to Kerma, apparently as a gesture of triumph by Kerma's ruler.

New Kingdom period 
Under Thutmose I, Egypt made several campaigns south, destroying Kerma. This eventually resulted in the Egyptian annexation of Nubia (Kerma/ Kush) c.1504 BC, and the establishment a southern frontier at Kurgus, south of the Fourth Cataract. After the conquest, Kerma culture was increasingly 'Egyptianized' yet rebellions continued for 220 years (till c.1300 BC). During the New Kingdom, Kerma/Kush nevertheless became a key province of the Egyptian Empire - economically, politically and spiritually. Indeed, major Pharonic ceremonies were held at Jebel Barkal near Napata, which included a large Amun temple.

The New Kingdom of Egypt maintained control of Lower and Middle Nubia, with a Viceroy of Kush, or 'King's Son of Kush'.  Egyptian settlements were established on Sai Island, Sedeinga, Soleb, Mirgissa, and Sesibi.  Qubban continued to play a strategic role in Eastern Desert gold mining operations.

The extent of cultural/political continuity between the Kingdom of Kerma and the chronologically succeeding Kingdom of Kush is difficult to determine. The latter polity began to emerge around 1000 BC, around 500 years after the end of the Kingdom of Kerma. Initially, the Kushite kings continued to use Kerma for royal burials and special ceremonies, suggesting some connection. Moreover, the layout of royal funerary compounds in both Kerma and Napata (the Kush capital) are similarly designed. Caches of statues of Kush's pharaohs have also been discovered at Kerma, suggesting that the Napatan rulers recognized a historic link between their capital and Kerma.

Language

The linguistic affiliation of the Kerma culture is currently unknown, and membership to both the Nilo-Saharan and Afro-Asiatic language families has been proposed.

According to Peter Behrens (1981) and Marianne Bechaus-Gerst (2000), linguistic evidence indicates that the Kerma peoples spoke Afroasiatic languages of the Cushitic branch. They propose that the Nilo-Saharan Nobiin language today contains a number of key pastoralism related loanwords that are of proto-Highland East Cushitic origin, including the terms for sheep/goatskin, hen/cock, livestock enclosure, butter and milk. They argue that this in turn suggests that the Kerma population — which, along with the C-Group Culture, inhabited the Nile Valley immediately before the arrival of the first Nubian speakers — spoke Afroasiatic languages.

Claude Rilly (2010, 2016) on the other hand, suggests that the Kerma peoples spoke Nilo-Saharan languages of the Eastern Sudanic branch, possibly ancestral to the later Meroitic language, which he also suggests was Nilo-Saharan. Rilly also criticizes proposals (by Behrens and Bechaus-Gerst) of significant early Afro-Asiatic influence on Nobiin, and considers evidence of substratal influence on Nobiin from an earlier now extinct Eastern Sudanic language to be stronger.

Julien Cooper (2017) also suggests that Nilo-Saharan languages of the Eastern Sudanic branch were spoken by the people of Kerma, as well as those further south along the Nile, to the west, and those of Saï (an island to the north of Kerma), but that Afro-Asiatic (most likely Cushitic) languages were spoken by other peoples in Lower Nubia (such as the Medjay and the C-Group culture) living in Nubian regions north of Saï toward Egypt and those southeast of the Nile in Punt in the Eastern dessert. Based partly on an analysis of the phonology of place names and personal names from the relevant regions preserved in ancient texts, he argues that the terms from "Kush" and "Irem" (ancient names for Kerma and the region south of it respectively) in Egyptian texts display traits typical of Eastern Sudanic languages, while those from further north (in Lower Nubia) and east are more typical of the Afro-Asiatic family, noting: "The Irem-list also provides a similar inventory to Kush, placing this firmly in an Eastern Sudanic zone. These Irem/Kush-lists are distinctive from the Wawat-, Medjay-, Punt-, and Wetenet-lists, which provide sounds typical to Afroasiatic languages."

Cooper (2017, 2020) suggests that an Eastern Sudanic language (perhaps early Meroitic) was spoken at Kerma by at least 1800 BC (the time from which toponymic evidence is available), whose arrival, and that of a new ethno-linguistic group, around that time may perhaps be indicated by a change in placenames for Upper Nubia used in Egyptian execration texts. However, Cooper also proposes that a similar Eastern Sudanic language may have been already spoken in Upper Nubia, both at Kerma and the Saï polity to its north, earlier (by Kerma Moyen, which began around 2050 BC), while north of Saï, in Lower Nubia, Cushitic languages were spoken and much later replaced by Meroitic. It is posited that early Meroitic spread, displacing Eastern Sudanic and Cushitic languages along the Nile."

Archaeology

20th century archaeology

When Kerma was first excavated in the 1920s, George Andrew Reisner believed that it originally served as the base for or was a fort of an Egyptian governor, and that these Egyptian rulers evolved into the independent monarchs of Kerma. Reisner's interpretation was predicated on the presence of inscribed Egyptian statues in the large burials, which he thought belonged to those named individuals. Thus, scholars accepted the view that Kerma was a trading outpost of the Egyptians, being too small and far away from the known borders of ancient Egypt to be more directly linked to it. 

It was only starting in mid-20th century that excavations began to reveal that Kerma city was much larger and more complex than previously assumed. It was also realized that the material culture and burial practices here are overwhelmingly of local Kerman origin rather than Egyptian.

Swiss archaeologist Charles Bonnet was among the first scholars to challenge Reisner's views and, according to him, it took 20 years for Egyptologists to accept his arguments.

21st century archaeology

In 2003, archaeologist Charles Bonnet heading a team of Swiss archaeologists excavating near Kerma discovered a cache of monumental black granite statues of the Pharaohs of the Twenty-fifth Dynasty of Egypt now exposed in the Kerma Museum. Among the sculptures were ones belonging to the dynasty's last two pharaohs, Taharqa and Tanoutamon, whose statues are described as "masterpieces that rank among the greatest in art history."

Craniometric analysis of Kerma fossils comparing them to various other early populations inhabiting the Nile Valley and Maghreb found that they were morphologically close to Predynastic Egyptians from Naqada (4000–3200 BC). The Kermans were also more distantly related to Dynastic Egyptians from Gizeh (323 BC– AD 330) and Predynastic Egyptian samples from Badari (4400–4000 BC), followed by the ancient Garamantes of Libya (900 BC- AD 500), who were found to be most closely related to Neolithic sub-Saharan African samples, and Roman period Egyptians, and secondary to modern Tunisians and Moroccans as well as early osteological series from Algeria (1500 BC), Carthage in Tunisia (751 BC– AD 435), Soleb in Nubia (1575–1380 BC), and Ptolemaic dynasty-era samples from Alexandria in Egypt (323 BC– AD 30).

Dental trait analysis of Kerma fossils found affinities with various populations inhabiting the Nile Valley, Horn of Africa, and Northeast Africa, especially to other ancient populations from the central and northern Sudan. Among the sampled populations, the Kerma people were overall nearest to the Kush populations in Upper Nubia, the A-Group culture bearers of Lower Nubia, and to Ethiopians, followed by the Meroitic, X-Group and Christian period inhabitants of Lower Nubia, and then to the C-Group and Pharaonic era skeletons excavated in Lower Nubia and ancient Egyptians (Naqada, Badari, Hierakonpolis, Abydos and Kharga in Upper Egypt; Hawara in Lower Egypt).

Claude Rilly, citing anthropologist Christian Simon, reports that the population of the Kingdom of Kerma was morphologically heterogeneous, with three main clusters in terms of morphological tendencies (A, B, C): Cluster A is similar to a sample of modern Kenyan skeletons. Cluster C is similar to a sample of Middle Empire skeletons from the region of Assuan, and Cluster B, which although distinct from Cluster C, shares many common features with it. Rilly continues: "However, the fact that their cemetery remained on the ancestral site might indicate cultural and ethnical continuity between Pre-Kerma and the new city. Cluster A and B were already present in Kerma ancien, but become majoritary in the following stage."

S.O.Y. Keita, conducted an anthropological study which examined the crania of groups in the North African region which included samples from Kerma, circa 2000 BC, the Maghreb region, circa 1500 BC, and 1st dynasty crania from the royal tombs in Abydos, Egypt. The results of the study determined the predominant pattern of the First Dynasty Egyptian crania was "Southern" or a “tropical African variant” (though others were also observed), which had affinities with Kerma Kushites. The general results demonstrate greater affinity with Upper Nile Valley groups, but also suggest clear change from earlier craniometric trends. The gene flow and movement of northern officials to the important southern city may explain the findings.

See also
 List of monarchs of Kerma
 Gash Group

References

Further reading

 Reisner, G. A. 1923,  Excavations at Kerma I-III/IV-V. Harvard African Studies Volume V. Peabody Museum of Harvard University, Cambridge Mass.
 Hafsaas-Tsakos, H. 2009, The Kingdom of Kush: An African centre on the periphery of the Bronze Age World System. Norwegian Archaeological Review, 42/1: 50-70.
 Bonnet, Charles, et al., 2005, Des Pharaohs venus d'Afrique : La cachette de Kerma. Citadelles & Mazenod.
 Bonnet, Charles, 1986,  Kerma, Territoire et Métropole, Institut Français d’Archaéologie Orientale du Caire.
 Bonnet, Charles, 2014, La ville de Kerma, Favre .
 Kendall, Timothy 1997.  Kerma and the Kingdom of Kush.  National Museum of African Art, Smithsonian Inst. Washington D.C.
 Bechaus-Gerst, Marianne, 2000, The Origins and Development of African Livestock: Archaeology, Genetics, Linguistics and Ethnography, "Linguistic evidence for the prehistory of livestock in Sudan". Routledge.

External links
 Swiss Archeological Mission: Kerma website - Official website of the Swiss archeological mission to Sudan
 P. DeMola (2013), Interrelations of Kerma and Pharaonic Egypt. worldhistory.org

 
History of Nubia
African civilizations
Kingdom of Kush
16th-century BC disestablishments
States and territories established in the 3rd millennium BC
States and territories disestablished in the 16th century BC
25th-century BC establishments
Kerma
Nubia
Archaeology of Sudan
Countries in ancient Africa